Raoul Marco (22 November 1892 – 3 April 1971) was a French film actor.

Partial filmography

 Bric à Brac et compagnie (1931) - Monsieur Verly
 Le gendre de Monsieur Poirier (1933) - Le premier créancier
 The Red Robe (1933) - Bridet
 Chourinette (1934)
 A Man Has Been Stolen (1934) - Inspector
 Les deux canards (1934)
 Liliom (1934) - L'inspecteur - The Detective
 L'or (1934) - O'Kelly
 Night in May (1934) - Le sergent
 The Queen of Biarritz (1934) - Esteban, le mari
 Le diable en bouteille (1935)
 The Mysteries of Paris (1935) - Le Chourineur
 Light Cavalry (1935) - Pietro
 Les gaîtés de la finance (1936) - Le detective
 Donogoo (1936) - (uncredited)
 Ernest the Rebel (1938) - Sam
 L'enfer des anges (1941) - (uncredited)
 Le briseur de chaînes (1941) - Alphonse
 Finance noire (1943) - X27
 The Woman Who Dared (1944) - Monsieur Noblet
 La Rabouilleuse (1944)
 A Friend Will Come Tonight (1946) - Le maire
 Beauty and the Beast (1946) - The Usurer
 Copie conforme (1947) - Un inspecteur
 Dernière heure, édition spéciale (1949) - Le président
 The Pretty Miller Girl (1949) - Maître Guillaume
 The Unexpected Voyager (1950) - Dupont
 The Sleepwalker (1951) - Le directeur des magasins
 Identité judiciaire (1951) - Le docteur Martin - le médecin légiste
 Duel in Dakar (1951) - Vaminy
 My Wife, My Cow and Me (1952)
  (1952) - Le docteur
 Plume au vent (1952) - Docteur Magazelle
 The Last Robin Hood (1953) - Le principal
 Une fille dans le soleil (1953) - Coste-Combette
 The Lovers of Marianne (1954) - Jobert
 Leguignon the Healer (1954) - Le vétérinaire
 La bella Otero (1954) - Le directeur du Kursaal
 People of No Importance (1956) - Le propriétaire du magasin de meubles
 Paris, Palace Hotel (1956) - Le monsieur 'pince fesse'
 The Man in the Raincoat (1957) - Le régisseur
 The Case of Dr. Laurent (1957) - Un médecin du conseil de l'ordre (uncredited)
 Life Together (1958) - Le docteur Leclerc (uncredited)
 Asphalte (1959) - (uncredited)
 La tête contre les murs (1959)
 Ravishing (1960) - L'aubergiste
 The President (1961)
 Les livreurs (1961)
 The Devil and the Ten Commandments (1962) - (uncredited)
 Up from the Beach (1965) - Cobbler

References

Bibliography
 Phillips, Alastair. City of Darkness, City of Light: Émigré Filmmakers in Paris, 1929-1939. Amsterdam University Press, 2004.

External links

1892 births
1971 deaths
French male film actors
Male actors from Paris